Michael Maertens (born 30 October 1963) is a German actor. He appeared in more than forty films since 1988. His grandfather Willy Maertens was also an actor.

Selected filmography

References

External links 

1963 births
Living people
German male film actors